Cutaneous Streptococcus iniae infections cause a cellulitis of the hands, usually after a person handles tilapia, as this bacterium is a fish pathogen.

See also 
 Streptococcus iniae
 Skin lesion

References 

Bacterium-related cutaneous conditions
Zoonoses
Streptococcal infections